Antoine-Claude-Pierre Masson de La Motte-Conflans, Or Conflant, born in Vertus in 1727 – died in the same place in 1801 was an 18th-century French man of letters.

A lawyer at the Parlement de Paris, La Motte-Conflans was a member of the Société littéraire of Châlons-sur-Marne.

Works 
1748: l'Année sans merveille, ou Fausseté de l'année merveilleuse (by abbé Gabriel-François Coyer]]), Lille;
1747: l'Armée du Roi dans la Flandre hollandaise, ode,
 Épitre au Roi sur la paix ; Published under the name of an officer from Gascony
1747: Epître du magister de Lauffeldt an curé de Fontenoy, in-12° ;
1747: Étrennes du Parnasse, in-12° ;
1746: la Gloire de la ville d'Ypres sous le gouvernement français, ode,.

He provided the Encyclopédie by Diderot and D'Alembert, the articles Denier and Épier.

References

Sources 
 Joseph-Marie Quérard, La France littéraire, t. 5, Paris, Firmin-Didot, 1862, 1833, (p. 611).
 Frank A. Kafker, Notices sur les auteurs des dix-sept volumes de « discours » de l'Encyclopédie, Recherches sur Diderot et sur l'Encyclopédie, 1989, Volume 7, Numéro 7, (pp. 125–150)

External links 
 Antoine-Claude-Pierre Masson de La Motte-Conflans on Wikisource

1727 births
18th-century French writers
18th-century French male writers
Contributors to the Encyclopédie (1751–1772)
1801 deaths